Virginia's 34th House of Delegates district elects one of 100 seats in the Virginia House of Delegates, the lower house of the state's bicameral legislature. District 34 represents portions of Fairfax and Loudoun counties. Represented for 25 years by  Republican Vincent Callahan, as of 2020 the 34th district is represented by Democrat Kathleen J. Murphy.

Electoral history

2013
In the 2013 general election, Republican incumbent Barbara Comstock was challenged by Democrat Kathleen Murphy, a former Clinton administration official in the U.S. Department of Commerce. Comstock edged out Murphy, winning re-election by 258 votes.

2015
Incumbent Comstock was elected to Congress in November 2014, vacating her House of Delegates seat and prompting a special election on January 6, 2015. In another close contest, Democrat Murphy defeated Republican Craig Parisot by 326 votes. In the November general election, the same candidates ran again. Murphy won re-election by 188 votes.

2017 
Murphy was re-elected with 61% of the vote, defeating Republican Cheryl Buford.

2019 
Challenged by Republican Gary Pan, Murphy was re-elected with 58% of the vote.

District officeholders

References

Virginia House of Delegates districts
Government in Fairfax County, Virginia
Government in Loudoun County, Virginia